The 1975 Cleveland Browns season was the team's 26th season with the National Football League.
The Browns lost their first nine games—again, a team record—en route to going 3–11 in Forrest Gregg's first year as head coach after having been promoted from offensive line coach following the offseason firing of Nick Skorich.

Making matters even harder to swallow was that, save for a 16–15 decision at Denver in Week 5 and a 24–17 decision at Cincinnati in the season opener, the losses were pretty much one-sided. At home no less, the Browns fell 42–10 to the Minnesota Vikings, 42–6 to the Pittsburgh Steelers and 40–10 to the Houston Oilers, the worst three-game stretch they've ever had. Later in the year—it was the last of those nine consecutive defeats—the Browns were beaten 38–17 at Oakland.

The Steelers and Vikings both finished 12–2, the Oilers just missed the playoffs at 10–4 and the 11–3 Raiders lost to Pittsburgh in the AFC Championship Game, but none of that was of any consolation to a franchise as proud as the Browns. After 1974, the Browns were hoping that '75, in which the team went to orange pants and altered its basic uniform design for the first time since that inaugural season of 1946, would usher in a new era of success. But it didn't work out that way. The problem for the Browns was that they were in the middle of a major rebuilding phase, trying to replace old-line, grizzled veterans from the team's glory days of the 1960s with free agents from other teams, or young players. Another problem was at the QB position; Mike Phipps, the Browns' No. 3 overall pick in the 1970 NFL Draft, threw just four touchdown passes with 19 INTs on the year. More and more, Browns fans were calling for Brian Sipe, who started in two victories in the final five games in 1974, to permanently secure the starting quarterback job in what became a major quarterback controversy.

Asides from the progress of Sipe, another diamond in the rough was Greg Pruitt. With Pro Football Hall of Famer Leroy Kelly having retired after the 1973 season, Pruitt, the first of the team's two second-round draft picks that year, had taken a quantum leap in '75 into settling into his job as the go-to running back. He raced for 214 yards, still the seventh-best performance in team history, en route to putting together the first of his three-straight 1,000-yard seasons by getting 1,067. He became the first 1,000-yard runner for the team since Kelly in 1968.

Pruitt averaged 4.8 yards per carry in 1975, the highest by a Brown since Kelly's 5.0 in 1968, and, while scoring three times against the Chiefs, rushed for eight touchdowns, the most since Kelly's 10 in 1971.

Offseason

NFL draft
The following were selected in the 1975 NFL Draft.

Personnel

Staff / Coaches

Roster

Exhibition schedule

Schedule

Note: Intra-division opponents are in bold text.

Standings

Postseason

Awards and records

Milestones 
 Greg Pruitt, 304 Combined Net Yards vs. the Cincinnati Bengals, November 23,

References

External links 
 1975 Cleveland Browns at Pro Football Reference
 1975 Cleveland Browns Statistics at jt-sw.com
 1975 Cleveland Browns Schedule at jt-sw.com
 1975 Cleveland Browns at DatabaseFootball.com  
 Season summary and statistics at Cleveland Browns.com

Cleveland
Cleveland Browns seasons
Cleveland Browns